AllTrails is a fitness and travel mobile app used in outdoor recreational activities. AllTrails is commonly used for outdoor activities such as hiking, mountain biking, climbing and snow sports. The service allows users to access a database of trail maps, which includes crowdsourced reviews and images. Depending on a user's subscription status these resources can be used online and offline.

AllTrails first launched in 2010 within the AngelPad accelerator program and gained seed funding shortly thereafter from the firms 500 Global (previously 500 Startups) and 2020 Ventures. In 2018, AllTrails was acquired by Spectrum Equity.

AllTrails operates on a freemium business model. It is accessible through a mobile app or a web browser for computers.

History

Founding
AllTrails was founded in 2010 by Russell Cook. It was accepted into AngelPad's inaugural class. This incubation period preceded its official launch in December 2010.

2011-2012
In 2011, within one year of its launch, AllTrails gained $400k in seed funding from two venture capital funds.

A major partnership between National Geographic and AllTrails was announced in early 2012. This partnership gave the app a boost to its user base and augmented its mapping data. This partnership resulted in National Geographic's Topo.com being merged and redirected to AllTrails.

In Q4 of 2012, AllTrails crossed the 1 million install milestone.

In 2018, though the company was said to be cash flow positive, it announced a new round of funding which ultimately resulted in its acquisition.

2015-2017

In August 2016, AllTrails announced that it had acquired EveryTrail from TripAdvisor, who had formerly acquired the company in 2011.

AllTrails was listed in the 100 Best Android Apps of 2017 by PhanDroid.

2018-2019
In 2018, Spectrum Equity provided $75M in funding to AllTrails in exchange for a majority position in  the company. This infusion of capital enabled the company to focus on business expansion and to attract additional talent. At that time, Ben Spero and Matt Neidlinger of Spectrum Equity joined AllTrails’ board of directors.

In May 2019, AllTrails announced that the app was available in French, German and Spanish. Formerly, the app had only been available in English.

AllTrails partnered with Rolling Strong in December 2019 to help truck drivers stay fit and healthy on the road.

2020
In the summer of 2020, Apple partnered with AllTrails to add hiking information to their Apple Maps. This was largely in response to the growing popularity of outdoor activities during the global COVID-19 pandemic. These trends in behavior contributed to "8.7 million users" installing the application in 2020 which was a "89%" increase from the previous year.

2021
In early 2021, AllTrails broke the news that it had officially reached 1 million paid subscribers.

Operation 
Registration is required on AllTrails. Users can register via Apple, Facebook, Google or by manually entering their name, email and password.

Once a user has registered, they will be able to search and explore trails which is the core value proposition of the app. Upon arriving at a trail, a user will be able to see information about the trail, track their activity, or even add new trails to the service. Additional features are available but require users to purchase a subscription in order to access them.

Features 
AllTrails operates on a freemium service. Users can access the app's advanced features via a subscription service called AllTrails+.

Users 
As of January 2012, AllTrails had reached 200,000 users. In that year, AllTrails partnered with NatGeo. By the end of the year it had crossed the 1 million install mark.

As of August 2020, AllTrails claims a global user base of over 20 million in more than 100 countries.

Acquisitions 
Since its founding in 2010, AllTrails has acquired a number of competing organizations: Every Trail, Gpsies, Trails.com. With the exception of GPSies, all other apps were either integrated into the company or discontinued as of July 2020.

 The GPSies acquisition was announced on July 30, 2019.
 The Trails.com acquisition was announced on July 18, 2019.
 The  acquisition was announced on April 24, 2019.
 The EveryTrail acquisition was announced on August 16, 2016.

All acquisitions were made for undisclosed sums.

References

External links 
 

Android (operating system) software
Collaborative mapping
GIS software
Google Maps
Internet properties established in 2010
IOS software
Mobile route-planning software
Web Map Services
Route planning websites